Allegheny Township is the name of some places in the U.S. state of Pennsylvania:
Allegheny Township, Armstrong County, Pennsylvania, a historical township broken up in 1878, becoming Bethel, Gilpin and Parks Townships
Allegheny Township, Blair County, Pennsylvania
Allegheny Township, Butler County, Pennsylvania
Allegheny Township, Cambria County, Pennsylvania
Allegheny Township, Somerset County, Pennsylvania
Allegheny Township, Venango County, Pennsylvania
Allegheny Township, Westmoreland County, Pennsylvania

See also
Allegany Township, Potter County, Pennsylvania
 Allegheny, Pennsylvania (disambiguation)

Pennsylvania township disambiguation pages